Papillitis is an inflammation of a papilla.

Examples include:
 Optic papillitis
 Foliate papillaitis, an inflammation of the foliate papilla